Jean van de Velde (born 29 May 1966) is a French professional golfer, who formerly played on the European Tour and the PGA Tour. He is best known for his runner-up finish at the 1999 Open Championship, where he lost a three-shot lead on the final hole.

Early life and amateur career
Van de Velde was born in Mont-de-Marsan, Landes, France.

As an amateur he won both the French Youths Championship and the French Amateur Championship. He represented his country at the European Youths' Team Championship and also at the 1986 Eisenhower Trophy in Caracas, Venezuela, were his team finished tied 8th and van de Velde best French player, tied 11th individually.

Professional career
Van de Velde turned professional in 1987 and his rookie season on the European Tour was 1989. His first European Tour win was the 1993 Roma Masters. He has twice finished in the top twenty of the Order of Merit.

He represented France twelve times in the World Cup and six times in the Alfred Dunhill Cup.

1999 Open Championship
Van de Velde was ranked 152 in the world, and with only one previous European Tour victory, when he nearly achieved an upset victory at the 1999 Open Championship at Carnoustie. Going into the final round, he held a five shot lead over Justin Leonard and Craig Parry. Van de Velde arrived at the 18th tee with a three shot lead, needing only a double bogey six to become the first Frenchman since 1907 to win a major golf tournament. He had played error-free golf for much of the week and birdied the 18th hole in two previous rounds at the tournament.

Van de Velde chose to use his driver off the tee, and he drove the ball to the right of the burn, where he was lucky to find land. Rather than laying up and hitting the green with his third, Van de Velde decided to go for the green with his second shot. His shot drifted right, ricocheted backwards off the railings of the grandstands by the side of the green, landed on top of the stone wall of the Barry Burn and then bounced fifty yards backwards into knee-deep rough.

On his third shot, Van de Velde's club got tangled in the rough on his downswing, and his ball flew into the Barry Burn, a water hazard. He removed his shoes and socks and stepped through shin-deep water as he debated whether to try to hit his ball out of the Barry Burn, which guards the 18th green. Ultimately, he took a drop and then hit his fifth shot into the greenside bunker. Van de Velde shot to within six feet from the hole, and made the putt for a triple-bogey seven, dropping him into a three-way playoff with Justin Leonard and Paul Lawrie. Lawrie won in the playoff.

The performance has become infamous in professional golf history. ESPN once called it the "biggest collapse" in golf, and in 2016 ranked it 13th on its list of 25 worst collapses in sports history. USA Today ranked it 4th in 2016 on its list of worst collapses in sports.

1999 Ryder Cup
Van de Velde represented Europe, automatically selected by ranking points, at the 1999 Ryder Cup at The Country Club, Brookline, Massachusetts. European team captain Mark James chose not to let van de Velde along with also rookies Jarmo Sandelin and Andrew Coltart participate in any matches the first two days, why the three of them had to make debut during the single games the final day of the match. Due to the lineup of the players in the two respective teams, van de Velde, Sandelin and Coltart came to face the three, at the time, highest ranked U.S. players, Davis Love III, David Duval and Tiger Woods. Van de Velde lost 6 and 5 against Love and Team Europe lost the Ryder Cup 141⁄2–131⁄2, despite leading by four points going into the final day.

Later career participate
Van de Velde played on the PGA Tour in 2000 and 2001. He finished tied 2nd at the 2000 Touchstone Energy Tucson Open and 2nd at the 2000 Reno–Tahoe Open, losing in a play-off.

In the new millennium, Van de Velde was troubled by injuries for several years. He injured his knee at a skiing incident in 2003, needing an operation. He made a comeback at the 2005 Open de France, where he lost a playoff to fellow Frenchman Jean-François Remésy after, once again, finding water on the last hole.

In 2006, he won his second European Tour title, 13 years after his first one, at the Madeira Island Open Caixa Geral de Depositos. With a three-stroke lead entering the last hole, van de Velde made a double bogey on the 72nd hole, but still finished with a 68 to win by a shot.

In 2016, van de Velde turned 50 and became eligible for senior tournaments, why he attended the 2016 Senior Open Championship, played at Carnoustie Golf Links, the place for his 1999 Open  Championship runner-up finish. Van de Velde missed the cut by nine shots after shooting 83–74.

In 2018, he played ten tournaments on the European Senior Tour, finishing 52nd on the Order of Merit.

Affiliations
In 2012, he was named by UNICEF France as an ambassador – only the second French sportsman, after Lilian Thuram, to achieve this.

Since 2019, he has hosted the Legends Open de France hosted by Jean van de Velde, in 2021 and 2022 played at Golf de Saint-Cloud outside Paris.

Amateur wins
1985 French Youths Championship
1986 French Youths Championship, French Amateur Championship

Professional wins (7)

European Tour wins (2)

European Tour playoff record (1–2)

Other wins (5)
1988 UAP European Under-25 Championship
1995 French PGA Championship
1996 French PGA Championship
1998 Championnat de France Pro
1999 Championnat de France Pro

Playoff record
PGA Tour playoff record (0–2)

Results in major championships

CUT = missed the half-way cut
"T" = tied

Summary

Most consecutive cuts made – 3 (1999 Open Championship – 2000 Masters)
Longest streak of top-10s – 1

Results in The Players Championship

CUT = missed the halfway cut

Results in World Golf Championships

1Cancelled due to 9/11

QF, R16, R32, R64 = Round in which player lost in match play
"T" = Tied
NT = No tournament

Team appearances
Amateur
European Youths' Team Championship (representing France): 1984
Eisenhower Trophy (representing France): 1986
St Andrews Trophy (representing the Continent of Europe): 1986

Professional
World Cup (representing France): 1989, 1990, 1991, 1992, 1993, 1994, 1995, 1996, 1997, 1998, 2000, 2006
Alfred Dunhill Cup (representing France): 1990, 1992, 1994, 1997, 1998, 1999
Ryder Cup (representing Europe): 1999
Seve Trophy (representing Continental Europe): 2000 (winners), 2011 (non-playing captain)

References

External links

French male golfers
European Tour golfers
PGA Tour golfers
European Senior Tour golfers
Ryder Cup competitors for Europe
Sportspeople from Landes (department)
People from Mont-de-Marsan
1966 births
Living people